Krusenstern is a lunar impact crater that lies amidst the battered terrain in the southern part of the Moon's near side. Nearly attached to the east-southeast rim is the crater Apianus. Less than one crater diameter to the southwest is the prominent Werner. Krusenstern is intruding into a large circular plain to the north designated Playfair G. Playfair itself lies to the northeast.

Krusenstern is 47 kilometers in diameter, and its walls reach a height of 1,600 meters.
Its outer rim has been heavily worn by impact erosion, leaving an irregular ring of rising ridges and an inner wall incised by impacts. A joined pair of craters, including Krusenstern A, lie along the eastern rim. The interior floor of Krusenstern is a nearly featureless plain, marked only by a few tiny craterlets. The crater is from the Pre-Nectarian period, 4.55 to 3.92 billion years ago.

It is named after Adam Johann von Krusenstern, an early 19th-century Baltic German explorer in Russian service.

Satellite craters
By convention these features are identified on lunar maps by placing the letter on the side of the crater midpoint that is closest to Krusenstern.

References

Impact craters on the Moon
Pre-Nectarian